Ann Mercken (born 6 May 1974 in Hasselt) is a retired Belgian athlete who specialised in the 400 metres hurdles. She represented her country at the 1996 Summer Olympics reaching the semifinals. She also competed at the 1999 World Championships.

Her personal best in the event is 54.95, set in 1996. This was the national record until Paulien Couckuyt improved it to 54.90 at the 2020 Summer Olympics.

Competition record

References

1974 births
Living people
Belgian female hurdlers
Athletes (track and field) at the 1996 Summer Olympics
Olympic athletes of Belgium
World Athletics Championships athletes for Belgium
Sportspeople from Hasselt
Flemish sportspeople
Competitors at the 1995 Summer Universiade
Competitors at the 1999 Summer Universiade
Competitors at the 2001 Summer Universiade